Wayne Hart (born February 13, 1949) is a Canadian curler.

He played at the 1988 Winter Olympics when curling was a demonstration sport, Canadian men's team won bronze medal.

Teams

References

External links

Wayne Hart – Curling Canada Stats Archive

Living people
1949 births
People from the Municipal District of Taber
Curlers from Calgary
Canadian male curlers
Brier champions
World curling champions
Curlers at the 1988 Winter Olympics
Olympic curlers of Canada